Amy Gornall (born 13 September 1996) is a British professional racing cyclist who rides for Podium Ambition Pro Cycling.

See also
 List of 2016 UCI Women's Teams and riders

References

External links
 

1996 births
Living people
British female cyclists
Place of birth missing (living people)
21st-century British women